Dancemania Speed is a sub-series of Toshiba EMI's Dancemania compilation series. This series features faster, further remixed versions of recordings from previously released Dancemania albums or faster remixed covers of various famous songs. Unlike the main series mostly consisting of Eurodance, this series largely consists of hardcore techno crews from the UK, the home of happy hardcore, and some Eurobeat Italians who are very much experienced in high BPM dance music.

History
The first issue, titled Dancemania Speed, was released on 23 September 1998 with Chumbawamba's "Tubthumping" as its beginning track along with 24 other tracks including Bellini's "Samba de Janeiro", Captain Jack's "Together & Forever", Me & My's "Dub-I-Dub", and E-Rotic's "Willy Use A Billy...Boy". The second issue, Dancemania Speed 2, was released on 3 March 1999 with tracks including "My Heart Will Go On", "Jump", "Butterfly", "Captain Jack", "Turn Me On" and "Techno Wonderland". The albums have appeared on the Oricon charts of best-selling albums since the first was released. Speed 1 reached number 8 in the weekly album chart in October 1998, Speed 2 reached number 7 in the same chart in March 1999 and ranked number 72 in the yearly Top 100 best-selling album chart in 1999 with 322,860 copies sold. Speed 3 reached number 5 in the weekly album chart in September 1999. Several tracks from 1, 2, 3, 4, 5 were later included on the 2000 greatest hits compilation Best 2001 Hyper Nonstop Megamix.

Releases

Main series

G series

Others

References

 
Eurodance compilation albums